The Rautenstrauch-Joest Museum is a museum of ethnography in Cologne, Germany.  It was reopened in 2010. The museum arose from a collection of over 3500 items belonging to ethnographer Wilhelm Joest. After his death in 1897, the collection was left to his sister Adele Rautenstrauch.

In 2018, the Rautenstrauch-Joest Museum returned a tattooed Maori skull, which had been in its collection for 110 years, to a delegation representing the Museum of New Zealand Te Papa Tongarewa in Wellington; the skull was purchased in 1908 by the first director of the Rautenstrauch Joest Museum, Willy Foy, from a London dealer.

References 

Museums in Cologne
Ethnographic museums in Germany